The News Line is a daily newspaper published by a British Trotskyist group, the Workers' Revolutionary Party.

History
The paper was launched in 1969 as Workers Press and renamed News Line in 1976.

For a time during the 1980s, the WRP split into two rival factions, and for a short time there were two versions of The News Line being produced every day, one by each faction.

Chris Hughton wrote a football column for the newspaper in the 1970s.

Editors
1969: Michael Banda
1974: Alex Mitchell
1980s: Paul Jennings

See also 
 Workers Revolutionary Party (Workers Press)
 List of left-wing publications in the United Kingdom

References

External links 
 The News Line
 Article about News Line

Communist newspapers
Socialist newspapers published in the United Kingdom
Workers Revolutionary Party (UK)
Publications established in 1969
National newspapers published in the United Kingdom
1969 establishments in the United Kingdom
Daily newspapers published in the United Kingdom